The Color of Paradise (Persian: رنگ خدا, Rang-e Khodā, literally The Color of God) is a 1999 Iranian film directed by Majid Majidi.

Plot 

The story revolves around a blind boy named Mohammad who is released from his special school in Tehran for summer vacation. His father, Hashem, shamed and burdened by Mohammad's blindness, arrives late to pick him up and then tries to convince the headmaster to keep Mohammad over the summer. The headmaster refuses, so Hashem eventually takes him home.

Hashem, who is a widower, now wants to marry a local woman and prepares for the wedding. He approaches the woman's parents with gifts, and they give him their blessing. He attempts to hide the fact that his son is blind because he fears that the girl's family will see it as a bad omen.

Meanwhile, Mohammad happily roams around the beautiful hills of his village with his sisters. He touches and feels the nature around him, counting the sounds of animals and imitating them. He displays a unique attitude toward nature and seems to understand its rhythms and textures as a language. Mohammad goes to the local school with his sisters and reads the lessons from his textbook in Braille, which amazes the children and the teacher.

Fearing his bride-to-be's family will learn of Mohammad, Hashem takes Mohammad away and leaves him with a blind carpenter who agrees to make him an apprentice. The blind carpenter begins to mentor the boy, but Mohammad begins to cry and expresses that he wants to see God. Mohammad says that God must not love him for making him blind, and says that his teacher taught that God loves the blind children more for their blindness. Mohammad then questions why God should make him blind if he truly loves him more. He also says that he wanted to be able to see God, and that his teacher said that God is everywhere and one can also feel God. The carpenter simply remarks that he agrees and walks away, possibly affected by the boy's words as he himself is blind.

Mohammad's grandmother is heartbroken when she realizes that Hashem has sent Mohammad away to apprentice under a blind carpenter, and, in her distress, she falls ill. She leaves the family home, but Hashem tries to convince her to stay, questioning his destiny, and lamenting his deceased wife and blind son. As she leaves, Mohammad's grandmother drops a hairpin from Mohammad into a pond and faints, falling into the water as she attempts to find it again. Hashem carries her back home. Eventually, Mohammad's grandmother dies. The bride's family sees this as a bad omen, and the wedding is called off.

His hopes destroyed, Hashem decides to bring Mohammad back. The film shows glimpses of shame and pity that Hashem felt for himself and his son all along. He returns to the blind carpenter and retrieves Mohammad. They head for home through the woods. As they cross a small wooden bridge over a rushing river, the bridge collapses and Mohammad falls into the water, carried away by the strong currents. For a moment, his father stands petrified, looking on in shock at the sight of his son being dragged away; he appears to be torn between rescuing him and freeing himself of his "burden." Moments later, he makes his decision, dashes into the river, and is also carried along swiftly by the roaring water, behind Mohammad.

Hashem wakes up on the shore of the Caspian Sea and sees Mohammad lying motionless a short distance away. He drags himself up and stumbles toward Mohammad's body and takes him in his arms. Hashem weeps over his son's body and looks to the skies. A woodpecker is heard, and the sun comes out; Mohammad's fingers slowly start to move. Perhaps he is "reading" the sound with his fingers as if they are Braille dots, or maybe, in his death, he has finally touched God.

Cast 
 Hossein Mahjoub as Hashem (Mohammad's father)
 Mohsen Ramezani as Mohammad (blind boy)
 Salameh Feyzi as Mohammad's grandmother

References

External links

1999 films
1999 drama films
Iranian drama films
1990s Persian-language films
Films about blind people
Films shot in Iran
Films set in Iran
Films directed by Majid Majidi
Crystal Simorgh for Audience Choice of Best Film winners
Films about disability